Dehydronorketamine (DHNK), or 5,6-dehydronorketamine, is a minor metabolite of ketamine which is formed by dehydrogenation of its metabolite norketamine. Though originally considered to be inactive, DHNK has been found to act as a potent and selective negative allosteric modulator of the α7-nicotinic acetylcholine receptor (IC50 = 55 nM). For this reason, similarly to hydroxynorketamine (HNK), it has been hypothesized that DHNK may have the capacity to produce rapid antidepressant effects. However, unlike ketamine, norketamine, and HNK, DHNK has been found to be inactive in the forced swim test (FST) in mice at doses up to 50 mg/kg. DHNK is inactive at the α3β4-nicotinic acetylcholine receptor (IC50 > 100 μM) and is only very weakly active at the NMDA receptor (Ki = 38.95 μM for (S)-(+)-DHNK). It can be detected 7–10 days after a modest dose of ketamine, and because of this, is useful in drug detection assays.

See also 
 Arketamine
 Esketamine

References 

Amines
Chloroarenes
Enones
Nicotinic antagonists
Human drug metabolites
Cyclohexenes